Sylvie Charrière (born 15 May 1961) is a French politician of La République En Marche! (LREM) who served as a member of the National Assembly from 2017 to 2022, representing the department of Seine-Saint-Denis.

Political career
In parliament, Charrière served on the Cultural and Education Affairs Committee.

She lost her seat in the 2022 French legislative election.

Other activities
 Conseil national d'évaluation du système scolaire (CNESCO), Member

Political positions
In July 2019, Charrière voted in favor of the French ratification of the European Union’s Comprehensive Economic and Trade Agreement (CETA) with Canada.

See also
 2017 French legislative election

References

1961 births
Living people
Deputies of the 15th National Assembly of the French Fifth Republic
La République En Marche! politicians
21st-century French women politicians
Place of birth missing (living people)
Women members of the National Assembly (France)